Proctocerini is a tribe of longhorn beetles of the subfamily Lamiinae described by Per Olof Christopher Aurivillius in 1921. It contains a single genus, Proctocera, described by Louis Alexandre Auguste Chevrolat in 1855. That genus contains the following species:

 Proctocera lugubris Thomson, 1858
 Proctocera quadriguttata Aurivillius, 1914
 Proctocera scalaris Chevrolat, 1855
 Proctocera senegalensis (Thomson, 1857)
 Proctocera vittata Aurivillius, 1913

References

Lamiinae
Taxa named by Per Olof Christopher Aurivillius
Cerambycidae genera